Elk is an unincorporated community in Tucker County in the U.S. state of West Virginia. The community's name is derived from its earlier one, Elklick. Elk is located on West Virginia Route 72.

Unincorporated communities in Tucker County, West Virginia
Unincorporated communities in West Virginia